The State of the Nation Address (Belarusian:Зварот Прэзідэнта Рэспублікі Беларусь з пасланнем да беларускага народа і Нацыянальнага сходу Рэспублікі Беларусь, Zvarot Prezidenta Respubłiki Bjełaruś z pasłanniem da biełaruskaga naroda i Nacyjanalnaga schodu Respubłiki Bjełaruś) is an annual speech given by the Belarusian President to outline the state and condition in which Belarus is in. 

The Address is given in front of a joint meeting of the two houses of the Belarusian Parliament: House of Representatives and Council of the Republic. The date of the presidential State-of-the-Nation Address is not fixed, and is determined each year based on the working schedule and the day when the very document is drafted.

It is similar to the State of the Union given by the President of the United States.

See also 
Government policy statement
State of the Nation (disambiguation), for addresses by heads of state
Speech from the throne

External links 
Key events in Belarus president’s address to nation, parliament (2014)

Speeches by heads of state
Presidents of Belarus